The 2022 Purdue Fort Wayne Mastodons baseball team was a baseball team that represented Purdue University Fort Wayne in the 2022 NCAA Division I baseball season. The Mastodons were members of the Horizon League and played their home games at Mastodon Field in Fort Wayne, Indiana. They were led by third-year head coach Doug Schreiber.

Previous season
In their first season in the Horizon League, the Mastodons finished the 2022 NCAA Division I baseball season 11–35 overall (8–28 conference) and seventh place in the conference standings, as the season was limited to only 40 games, and an increase of conference games from 30 to 36 due to the COVID-19 pandemic.

Roster

Schedule

! style="" | Regular Season
|- valign="top"

|- align="center" bgcolor="#ffcccc"
| 1 || February 18 || at Georgia State || Georgia State Baseball Complex • Atlanta, Georgia || 2–13 || Treadway (1–0) || J. Miller (0–1) || Lutz (1) || 372 || 0–1 || –
|- align="center" bgcolor="#ffcccc"
| 2 || February 19 || at Georgia State || Georgia State Baseball Complex • Atlanta, Georgia || 2–12 || Dawson (1–0) || Deany (0–1) || None || 395 || 0–2 || –
|- align="center" bgcolor="#ffcccc"
| 3 || February 19 || at Georgia State || Georgia State Baseball Complex • Atlanta, Georgia || 5–6 || Clark (1–0) || Myer (0–1) || None || 395 || 0–3 || –
|- align="center" bgcolor="#ffcccc"
| 4 || February 20 || at Georgia State || Georgia State Baseball Complex • Atlanta, Georgia || 7–8 || Reddick (1–0) || Martens (0–1) || Jones (1) || 385 || 0–4 || –
|- align="center" bgcolor="#ffcccc"
| 5 || February 25 || at  || James W. Totman Stadium • Riverside, California || 2–4 || Culpepper (2–0) || Miller (0–2) || Finnel (1) || 372 || 0–5 || –
|- align="center" bgcolor="#ffcccc"
| 6 || February 26 || at California Baptist || James W. Totman Stadium • Riverside, California || 5–23 || Necochea (1–0) || Wilson (0–1) || None || 336 || 0–6 || –
|- align="center" bgcolor="#ffcccc"
| 7 || February 26 || at California Baptist || James W. Totman Stadium • Riverside, California || 3–5 || Villalobos (1–0) || Myer (0–2) || None || 334 || 0–7 || –
|- align="center" bgcolor="#ffcccc"
| 8 || February 27 || at California Baptist || James W. Totman Stadium • Riverside, California || 1–11 || Silvas (2–0) || Martens (0–2) || None || 289 || 0–8 || –
|-

|- align="center" bgcolor="#ffcccc"
| 9 || March 4 || at  || Bush Stadium at Averitt Express Baseball Complex • Cookeville, Tennessee || 4–13 || Calitri (2–0) || Miller (0–3) || None || 257 || 0–9 || –
|- align="center" bgcolor="#ffcccc"
| 10 || March 5 || at Tennessee Tech || Bush Stadium at Averitt Express Baseball Complex • Cookeville, Tennessee || 1–7 || Gannaway (1–0) || Spencer (0–1) || Sylvester (1) || 301 || 0–10 || –
|- align="center" bgcolor="#ffcccc"
| 11 || March 6 || at Tennessee Tech || Bush Stadium at Averitt Express Baseball Complex • Cookeville, Tennessee || 7–15 || Taylor (1–0) || Myer (0–3) || None || 359 || 0–11 || –
|- align="center" bgcolor="#ffcccc"
| 12 || March 9 || at Indiana || Bart Kaufman Field • Bloomington, Indiana || 2–12 || Walker (1–0) || Stills (0–1) || None || 1,437 || 0–12 || –
|- align="center" bgcolor="#ffcccc"
| 13 || March 11 || at  || Billiken Sports Center • St. Louis, Missouri || 2–5 || Hutt (1–1) || Martens (0–3) || Weber (1) || 68 || 0–13 || –
|- align="center" bgcolor="#ccffcc"
| 14 || March 13 || at Saint Louis || Billiken Sports Center • St. Louis, Missouri || 4–1 || Spencer (1–1) || Harris (1–3) || Myer (1) || 114 || 1–13 || –
|- align="center" bgcolor="#ffcccc"
| 15 || March 13 || at Saint Louis || Billiken Sports Center • St. Louis, Missouri  || 2–5 || Schmitt (3–1) || Miller (0–4) || Pferrer (2) || 89 || 1–14 || –
|- align="center" bgcolor="#ffcccc"
| 16 || March 16 || Dayton || Mastodon Field • Fort Wayne, Indiana || 4–8 || Majick (2–0) || Myer (0–4) || None || 195 || 1–15 || –
|- align="center" bgcolor="#ffcccc"
| 17 || March 18 || Youngstown State || Mastodon Field • Fort Wayne, Indiana || 0–4 || Snyder (1–3) || Stills (0–2) || None || 174 || 1–16 || 0–1
|- align="center" bgcolor="#ccffcc"
| 18 || March 20 || Youngstown State || Defiance High School • Defiance, Ohio || 8–7 || Wilson (1–1) || Marshalwitz (1–1) || None || 125 || 2–16 || 1–1
|- align="center" bgcolor="#ffcccc"
| 19 || March 20 || Youngstown State || Defiance High School • Defiance, Ohio || 6–12 || Brosky (2–2) || Miller (0–5) || None || 155 || 2–17 || 1–2
|- align="center" bgcolor="#dddddd"
| – || March 23 || at  || Drayton McLane Baseball Stadium at John H. Kobs Field • East Lansing, Michigan ||colspan=12| Game postponed
|- align="center" bgcolor="#ccffcc"
| 21 || March 25 || at  || Oakland Baseball Field • Rochester, Michigan || 10–2 || Stills (1–2) || Sagedahl (1–4) || Myer (1) || – || 3–17 || 2–2
|- align="center" bgcolor="#ffcccc"
| 22 || March 25 || at Oakland || Oakland Baseball Field • Rochester, Michigan || 2–10 || Hagen (2–1) || Martens (0–4) || None || – || 3–18 || 2–3
|- align="center" bgcolor="#ffcccc"
| 23 || March 26 || at Oakland || Oakland Baseball Field • Rochester, Michigan || 9–10 || Paugh (1–1) || Miller (0–6) || None || 45 || 3–19 || 2–4
|- align="center" bgcolor="#ccffcc"
| 24 || March 29 || at  || Emory G. Bauer Field • Valparaiso, Indiana || 11–3 || Deany (1–1) || Lockwood (0–2) || None || 38 || 4–19 || 2–4
|-

|- align="center" bgcolor="#ffcccc"
| 25 || April 1 ||  || Mastodon Field • Fort Wayne, Indiana || 3–5 || Shirk (2–4) || Fee (0–1) || Luikart (3) || 158 || 4–20 || 2–5
|- align="center" bgcolor="#ffcccc"
| 26 || April 2 || Wright State || Mastodon Field • Fort Wayne, Indiana || 11–17 || Simpson (2–0) || Spencer (1–2) || Haught (1) || 201 || 4–21 || 2–6
|- align="center" bgcolor="#ffcccc"
| 27 || April 3 || Wright State || Mastodon Field • Fort Wayne, Indiana || 3–12 || Theis (2–0) || Miller (0–7) || None || 212 || 4–22 || 2–7
|- align="center" bgcolor="#ccffcc"
| 28 || April 6 || at Michigan || Ray Fisher Stadium • Ann Arbor, Michigan || 6–3 || Myer (1–4) || Cleveland (1–2) || Miller (1) || 579 || 5–22 || 2–7
|- align="center" bgcolor="#ccffcc"
| 29 || April 9 || at  || Franklin Field • Franklin, Wisconsin || 5–4 || Spencer (2–2) || Frey (3–2) || Miller (2) || 447 || 6–22 || 3–7
|- align="center" bgcolor="#ccffcc"
| 30 || April 9 || at Milwaukee || Franklin Field • Franklin, Wisconsin || 7–0 || Myer (2–4) || Blubaugh (3–2) || None || 447 || 7–22 || 4–7
|- align="center" bgcolor="#ccffcc"
| 31 || April 10 || at Milwaukee || Franklin Field • Franklin, Wisconsin || 7–6 || Skelton (1–0) || Edwards (0–2) || Wilson (1) || 416 || 8–22 || 5–7
|- align="center" bgcolor="#dddddd"
| – || April 12 || at Purdue || Alexander Field • West Lafayette, Indiana ||colspan=12| Game postponed
|- align="center" bgcolor="#ccffcc"
| 32 || April 14 || at  || Bill Aker Baseball Complex • Highland Heights, Kentucky || 9–5 || Deany (2–1) || Gerl (2–5) || None || 112 || 9–22 || 6–7
|- align="center" bgcolor="#ffcccc"
| 33 || April 15 || at Northern Kentucky || Bill Aker Baseball Complex • Highland Heights, Kentucky || 4–5 || Lonsbury (3–0) || Robison (0–1) || None || 154 || 9–23 || 6–8
|- align="center" bgcolor="#ccffcc"
| 34 || April 16 || at Northern Kentucky || Bill Aker Baseball Complex • Highland Heights, Kentucky || 10–5 || Skelton (2–0) || Echeman (1–6) || None || 213 || 10–23 || 7–8
|- align="center" bgcolor="#ffcccc"
| 35 || April 20 || at No. 18  || Frank Eck Stadium • Notre Dame, Indiana || 2–12 || Simon (1–0) || Madura (0–1) || None || 208 || 10–24 || 7–8
|- align="center" bgcolor="#ccffcc"
| 36 || April 22 || Northern Kentucky || Mastodon Field • Fort Wayne, Indiana || 4–2 || Deany (3–1) || Klingenbeck (2–2) || Miller (3) || 121 || 11–24 || 8–8
|- align="center" bgcolor="#ccffcc"
| 37 || April 22 || Northern Kentucky || Mastodon Field • Fort Wayne, Indiana || 4–3 || Skelton (3–0) || Lonsbury (3–2) || None || 121 || 12–24 || 9–8
|- align="center" bgcolor="#ffcccc"
| 38 || April 24 || Oakland || Mastodon Field • Fort Wayne, Indiana || 6–8 || Kujawa (1–1) || Wilson (1–2) || Stelling (2) || 144 || 12–25 || 9–9
|- align="center" bgcolor="#ffcccc"
| 39 || April 24 || Oakland || Mastodon Field • Fort Wayne, Indiana|| 7–9 || Paugn (4–1) || Miller (0–8) || None || 120 || 12–26 || 9–10
|- align="center" bgcolor="#ffcccc"
| 40 || April 27 || at Michigan State || Drayton McLane Baseball Stadium at John H. Kobs Field • East Lansing, Michigan || 4–7 || Arbaugh (1–0) || Hayden (0–1) || Bischoff (9) || 235 || 12–27 || 9–10
|- align="center" bgcolor="#ffcccc"
| 41 || April 29 ||  || Mastodon Field • Fort Wayne, Indiana || 3–7 || Peterson (4–3) || Deany (3–2) || None || 148 || 12–28 || 9–11
|- align="center" bgcolor="#ffcccc"
| 42 || April 30 || UIC || Mastodon Field • Fort Wayne, Indiana || 2–4 || Ingram (3–4) || Myer (2–5) || Shears (7) || 122 || 12–29 || 9–13
|-

|- align="center" bgcolor="#ffcccc"
| 43 || May 1 || UIC || Mastodon Field • Fort Wayne, Indiana || 5–21 || Lopez (5–3) || Spencer (2–3) || None || 167 || 12–30 || 9–13
|- align="center" bgcolor="#dddddd"
| 44 || May 6 || at Youngstown State || Eastwood Field • Niles, Ohio ||colspan=12| Game canceled
|- align="center" bgcolor="#dddddd"
| 45 || May 6 || at Youngstown State || Eastwood Field • Niles, Ohio ||colspan=12| Game canceled
|- align="center" bgcolor="#ccffcc"
| 46 || May 8 || at UIC || Les Miller Field at Curtis Granderson Stadium • Chicago, Illinois || 3–2 || Deany (4–2) || Lopez (5–4) || None || 211 || 13–30 || 10–13
|- align="center" bgcolor="#ffcccc"
| 47 || May 8 || at UIC || Les Miller Field at Curtis Granderson Stadium • Chicago, Illinois || 3–11 || Zahora (2–2) || Spencer (3–3) || None || 187 || 13–31 || 10–14
|- align="center" bgcolor="#ffcccc"
| 48 || May 10 || at Dayton || Woerner Field • Dayton, Ohio || 5–8 || Maue (1–1) || Robison (0–2) || Meyer (1) || 57 || 13–32 || 10–14
|- align="center" bgcolor="#ccffcc"
| 49 || May 13 || Milwaukee || Mastodon Field • Fort Wayne, Indiana || 2–1 || Skelton (4–0) || Frey (4–5) || None || 188 || 14–32 || 11–14
|- align="center" bgcolor="#ccffcc"
| 50 || May 13 || Milwaukee || Mastodon Field • Fort Wayne, Indiana || 14–4 || Miller (1–8) || DeYoung (0–2) || None || 189 || 15–32 || 12–14
|- align="center" bgcolor="#ccffcc"
| 51 || May 14 || at Wright State || Nischwitz Stadium • Dayton, Ohio || 5–4 || Deany (5–2) || Shirk (5–5) || Skelton (1) || 314 || 16–32 || 13–14
|- align="center" bgcolor="#ffcccc"
| 52 || May 14 || at Wright State || Nischwitz Stadium • Dayton, Ohio || 3–17 || Gongora (4–1) || Myer (2–6) || None || 341 || 16–33 || 13–15
|- align="center" bgcolor="#ccffcc"
| 53 || May 17 ||  || Mastodon Field • Fort Wayne, Indiana || 4–2 || Wilson (2–2) || MacCauley (3–4) || Stills (1) || 197 || 17–33 || 13–15
|- align="center" bgcolor="#ccffcc"
| 54 || May 20 || at  || Skeeles Field • Akron, Ohio || 6–5 || Stills (2–2) || Heydinger (2–10) || Miller (4) || 175 || 18–33 || 13–15
|- align="center" bgcolor="#ffcccc"
| 55 || May 20 || at Akron || Skeeles Field • Akron, Ohio || 6–7 || Dietrich (3–1) || Madura (0–2) || None || 175 || 18–34 || 13–15
|- align="center" bgcolor="#ffcccc"
| 56 || May 21 || at Akron || Skeeles Field • Akron, Ohio || 0–11 || Steinbaugh (2–3) || Spencer (2–5) || None || 215 || 18–35 || 13–15
|-

|-
! style="" | Postseason
|-

|- align="center" bgcolor="#ffcccc"
| 57 || May 25 || vs Youngstown State || Nischwitz Stadium • Dayton, Ohio || 0–11 || Brosky (6–7) || Deany (5–3) || None || 122 || 18–36 || 0–1

|}

Awards

Horizon League Players of the Week

Conference awards

References

Purdue
Purdue Fort Wayne Mastodons baseball seasons
Purdue Fort Wayne